Derekend or Tsamdzor is a village in the Khojavend District of Azerbaijan, in the disputed region of Nagorno-Karabakh. The village had an ethnic Armenian-majority population prior to the 2020 Nagorno-Karabakh war, and also had an Armenian majority in 1989.

History 
During the Soviet period, the village was part of the Hadrut District of the Nagorno-Karabakh Autonomous Oblast. After the First Nagorno-Karabakh War, the village was administrated as part of the Hadrut Province of the breakaway Republic of Artsakh. The village came under the control of Azerbaijan during the 2020 Nagorno-Karabakh war.

Historical heritage sites 
Historical heritage sites in and around the village include a cemetery from between the 16th and 19th centuries, the church of Surb Astvatsatsin built in 1696, a bridge from between the 17th and 19th centuries, and a reservoir created in the 19th century.

Demographics 
The village had 54 inhabitants in 2005, and 47 inhabitants in 2015.

References

External links 
 

Populated places in Khojavend District
Nagorno-Karabakh
Former Armenian inhabited settlements